Elena Podzámska (born 7 January 1972) is a Slovak actress and dubbing actress born in Bratislava.

Biography
After graduating from high school, Podzámska decided to study medicine, but after a month, she transferred to the Academy of Performing Arts (VŠMU), Department of Acting. Following her studies, she held engagements at the Slovak National Theatre and the Andrej Bagar Theatre in Nitra.

Podzámska moved to the United States after marrying her first husband, who was of American origin. They later returned to Europe and settled in Belgium, where she devoted herself to modelling and promotional work. After getting divorced, Podzámska moved back to Slovakia to pursue acting.

In 2010, she took part in season four of the Slovak television series Let's Dance.

Selected filmography

References

External links

 

1972 births
Living people
Slovak film actresses
Slovak television actresses
Slovak stage actresses
Actors from Bratislava
21st-century Slovak actresses
20th-century Slovak actresses